The East Verde River is a tributary of the Verde River in the U.S. state of Arizona. Beginning on the Mogollon Rim near Washington Park, it flows generally southwest through Gila County and the Tonto National Forest northeast of Phoenix. The East Verde River flows through parts of the Mazatzal Wilderness west of Payson.

The Salt River Project (SRP) supplements the natural flows on the East Verde River with water pumped from Blue Ridge Reservoir on East Clear Creek in Coconino County. The water travels  by pipeline to the East Verde at Washington Park, from whence it flows toward the Verde River and the SRP reservoir behind Horseshoe Dam. A significant fraction of the Blue Ridge water release of  a year is allocated to communities along or near the East Verde River.

Fish 
The Arizona Game and Fish Department lists the following fish species among those living in the East Verde River: rainbow trout, brown trout, smallmouth bass, and sunfish.

References

External links 
 Arizona fishing and boating locations map

Rivers of the Mogollon Rim
Rivers of Arizona
Rivers of Gila County, Arizona